This is a list of Hereford United F.C. players which covers the era from the beginning of the 1972–73 season to the present day.

Players who featured for the club before the beginning of the 1972–73 season are not included. If a listed player appeared for the club before this threshold (for example Colin Addison and Ronnie Radford), their appearances and goals prior to this threshold are not included in their totals.

Key
 A - Appearances;
 G - Goals;
 Lge - League (includes The Football League and Conference National);
 FaC - FA Cup;
 Oth - Other Competitions (includes the Football League Cup, Football League Trophy, Welsh Cup, FA Trophy and Play-off matches);
 Players in bold indicate those currently at the club

Players

Correct as of 7 December 2010

References

External links

Hereford United F.C.
Players
Herefordshire F.C.
Association football player non-biographical articles
List